Alagalla (literal translation: Tuber rock) Mountain Range is situated at the boundaries of the Central and Sabaragamuwa Provinces in Sri Lanka.

Historical importance 
Most of the battles to invade the Kandyan Kingdom took place at Balana (literal translation viewing point), with the Kandyan monarchs emerging victorious aided by the impenetrable mountain formations. The famous Balana Fort which functioned as a strategic rock fortress and an outpost to Kandyan kingdom was built between Kadugannawa Pass and Alagalla Mountain Range.

Meangalla Pass and Meeyangala tunnel 
The railway lines to upcountry were established by the English once the Kandyan Kingdom was absorbed into the British Empire in 1815.

Initially, the railway track was constructed by gouging artificial grooves on the rock at the top of the waterfall to "split" the waterfall into two and fall away from the rail route. The tracks were then set up around the inclined rock and this was called the  pass. However, this railway route was found to be dangerous, especially in the rainy season as heavy rains caused the swollen waterfall and slip rocks to damage the trains and the rail tracks.

This resulted in a more robust and safe rerouting via drilling through the solid rock.

Hiking through the Alagalla Mountains 

If following the  route, trekking can be started at  railway station through the  village. The   waterfall, served by the Alagalla forest reserve, can also be viewed slightly off-route. In both routes, the support of a local guide is strongly encouraged.

See also
 List of mountain ranges
 List of Southeast Asian mountains

References

Landforms of Kegalle District
Tourist attractions in Sabaragamuwa Province
Landforms of Central Province, Sri Lanka
Mountain ranges of Sri Lanka
Meeyangalla Tunnel